Shamanism in China (中国萨满教 Zhōngguó sàmǎnjiào) may refer to all the forms of shamanism practiced in China:
 Chinese shamanism or "Wuism", the term referring specifically to the indigenous shamanic tradition of the Han Chinese, practiced by wu;
 Tongji, southern Chinese mediumship;
 Chuma xian and other forms of shamanism within Northeast China folk religion;
 Manchu shamanism, practiced in northeast China;
 Mongolian shamanism, practiced in Inner Mongolia;
 Imperial shamanism in the Qing dynasty
 Shamans in Ming China